The 1959 Gael Linn Cup is a representative competition for elite level participants in the women's team field sport of camogie, was won by Leinster, who defeated Ulster in the final played at Casement Park.

Arrangements
The competition was distinguished by two close semi-finals, Leinster defeating Munster 7–2 to 6–3 at Dungarvan as Una O'Connor scored six goals for Lienster and Kay Downes scoring five for Munster, and Ulster defeating Connacht 3–4 to 3–3. Five goals from Una O'Connor helped Leinster to a 6–0 to 1–3 victory over Ulster. Agnes Hourigan wrote in the Irish Press: The scoreline suggest a more one sided game than ensued. Full credit must go to the Linester defence and goalkeeper for their display.

Final stages

|}

References

External links
 Camogie Association

1959 in camogie
1959
1959 in Northern Ireland sport